Douglas Theodore Pinnick (born September 3, 1950), sometimes stylized as dUg Pinnick or simply dUg, is an American musician best known as the bass guitarist, co-lead vocalist, and songwriter for the hard rock and progressive metal band King's X. He has performed on 15 albums with King's X, and recorded four solo albums. Pinnick has also participated in numerous side projects, and has multiple guest appearances to his credit. He is recognized for his unique vocals (which are characterized by a strong gospel influence), and heavily distorted bass tone. Pinnick often plays bass with a guitar pick, though he has also been seen using his fingers.

Biography 
Doug Pinnick was born in Braidwood, Illinois, and moved to Joliet, Illinois, when he was fourteen. He grew up in a musical family where everyone either sang or played an instrument. He was raised by his great-grandmother, a devoutly religious woman, and was reared in a very strict Southern Baptist environment. He has seventeen half-brothers and sisters, from three mothers and two fathers. When he was in grade school, Pinnick participated in choir and played saxophone. As a teenager, he listened to classic R&B and Motown artists such as Stevie Wonder, Little Richard, and Aretha Franklin. Pinnick sang in bands throughout high school, one of the earliest being a group called Stone Flower which he describes as "Chicago Transit Authority meets Sly & the Family Stone". While attending Joliet Junior College in 1969, Pinnick was inspired by hard rock bands such as Led Zeppelin and Jimi Hendrix. Around this time, he also started listening to perhaps his biggest influence, Sly & the Family Stone. His dream was to form a band that combined all of these varied influences.

After attending college for roughly six months, Pinnick dropped out and joined a traveling gospel band called The Spurrlows.

At one point in the early 1970s, Pinnick moved to a Christian community in Florida. There, he remained involved in the music business by promoting small shows by Christian rock bands. Shortly after that, he moved back to Illinois.

In the mid 1970s, Pinnick formed a band called Servant, with keyboardist Matt Spransy, that played progressive art rock along the lines of Yes and Emerson, Lake & Palmer. The band played in the midwest and put together a demo of original songs. There was another band called Servant who had scored a recording contract. Spransy joined the other band in the late seventies, and recorded "I'm Gonna Live" for the 1981 album Rockin' Revival that he and Pinnick had written together. Pinnick was also part of Alpha as well as his own Doug Pinnick Band shortly after Spransy joined the other Servant.

In 1979, Pinnick was invited to join a band that was forming in Springfield, Missouri with singer Greg X. Volz of Petra fame. He accepted the offer and re-located, only to have the band dissolve within a month of his arrival. He was soon offered a spot in guitarist Phil Keaggy's touring band, along with the drummer from the failed Volz project, Jerry Gaskill. Pinnick has a co-writing credit on the track "Just a Moment Away" from Keaggy's 1980 album Ph'lip Side. Pinnick toured with Keaggy for about a year before returning to Springfield and set about looking for a new musical project.

Pinnick soon became involved with guitarist Ty Tabor after seeing him play a concert at Evangel College in Springfield. Jerry Gaskill was later included and the band The Edge was born. In 1983, the band changed their name to Sneak Preview and released an independent, self titled LP. The trio evolved into King's X several years (and a move to Houston, Texas) later. Pinnick is the older member of King's X, with Tabor eleven years his junior, and Gaskill seven years younger than him.

Since then, Pinnick has become one of the most respected voices in rock music by fans, critics, and peers alike. He is highly sought-after by other artists for album guest appearances, as well as membership in several side bands and recording projects.

In 1998, Pinnick confirmed his homosexuality, coming out during an interview for Regeneration Quarterly. Diamante Music Group canceled distribution of King's X material in Christian retail stores following this information becoming public knowledge.  In recent years, Pinnick has revealed that he now identifies as agnostic, in contrast to his Contemporary Christian music past.

Besides King's X, Pinnick became active with his own Hound Pound studio in Texas. He currently resides in Los Angeles.

In March 2018, it was announced that original member of the proto punk band MC5, Wayne Kramer, would embark on a 35-date tour of North America for their 50th anniversary of the band's debut, Kick Out the Jams, recruiting Pinnick to play bass along with Kim Thayil of Soundgarden, Brendan Canty of Fugazi, and Marcus Durant of Zen Guerrilla.

Projects 
Pinnick's first solo project, Poundhound, released two albums, Massive Grooves and Pineappleskunk, with King's X bandmate Jerry Gaskill on drums on some tracks from the first album and all tracks on the second. Doug dropped the Poundhound moniker for his third solo album, Emotional Animal, instead crediting himself as "dUg Pinnick." The album, released by Magna Carta Records, features Gaskill's son, Joey, on drums.
He released his fourth solo album, Strum Sum Up in November 2007 on Magna Carta.

Pinnick was also a member of the short-lived band Supershine, along with long-time Trouble guitarist, Bruce Franklin and Trouble drummer, Jeff Olson.  Supershine released only one self-titled album in 2000 on Metal Blade Records. He sang lead vocals on the eponymous debut album by former Winger guitarist Reb Beach's band The Mob, released in 2005. He also stood in for lead singer Corey Glover on Living Colour's European tour in August 2006 while Glover was starring as Judas Iscariot in a tour of Jesus Christ Superstar.

Other vocal appearances by Doug Pinnick include Dream Theater's "Lines in the Sand" (guest vocals in the choruses) from the Falling into Infinity album, "Welcome to the Machine" from the An All Star Lineup Performing the Songs of Pink Floyd album, "Parasite" on an all-star tribute to Kiss entitled Spin The Bottle, as well as "Taxman" on a Beatles tribute album entitled Butchering the Beatles.

Pinnick appears on the 2008 holiday album We Wish You a Metal XMas..., a compilation album featuring many hard rock musicians collaborating on popular Christmas songs. Pinnick appears on the track "Little Drummer Boy". He performed guest vocals on the Black Sugar Transmission track "Runnin' Like a Dog", which was released on the band's e.p. USE IT in 2009. He also performs with King's X partner Ty Tabor, along with former Galactic Cowboys members Wally Farkas and Alan Doss, as a group called The Jibbs. They have a song, "Burns In The Rain", available via download to help relief efforts following Hurricane Ike.

Dug sang all lead vocals on Razr 13's (Austin, Texas) debut record "Reflections" released in 2009. Professional wrestler, Vinnie Vineyard (Funkmaster V) uses a remixed version of Pinnick's "Coming Over" as his entrance music. Hal Sparks used several tracks off of Pinnick's Strum Sum Up CD as his musical accompaniment during his magic show performances on VH1's Celebracadabra that aired in 2008

Pinnick's side project, Tres Mts., with Jeff Ament of Pearl Jam and Richard Stuverud of the Fastbacks, released their album, Three Mountains, through Monkeywrench Records in March 2011.
He also sang backup on Pearl Jam's song "W.M.A." during Pearl Jam's April 3, 1994, concert, which King's X opened for.

In February 2013, Magna Carta released the Mike Varney-produced Pinnick Gales Pridgen, featuring Eric Gales on guitar and vocals, Pinnick on bass and vocals, and Thomas Pridgen (formerly of The Mars Volta) on drums. The 13-track album features one cover song, "Sunshine of Your Love", originally by Cream, one short instrumental based on  Ludwig van Beethoven's "Für Elise", and the remaining songs written by some combination of Pinnick, Gales, Pridgen and Varney. The follow-up, titled PGP 2, was released on July 8, 2014.

In 2013, Pinnick collaborated with friend Robbi Robb of Tribe After Tribe to form the Mojave, California-based jam band 3rd Ear Experience.  They released two albums, Peacock Black and Boi, the later issued through Megaforce Records, within only months of each other.  A third album, Incredible Good Fortune, followed in 2014 although Pinnick did not appear on it.

In March 2014, Pinnick's all-star side project KXM, featuring former Dokken guitarist George Lynch and Korn drummer Ray Luzier, released their eponymous debut album through Rat Pak Records. In May 2014, Pinnick's side project Grinder Blues with the Bihlman Brothers signed a deal with Megaforce Records and announced an August 2014 release for their debut record.

Equipment 
Pinnick is a notable player of the 12-string bass, a bass guitar with four sets of triple-coursed octave strings, reminiscent of a 12-string guitar. Pinnick owns a custom made 12-string bass, made by Yamaha, which he uses in the studio and in live performances, and was endorsed by Pinnick, although he briefly switched to Dean guitars in the late 2000s. Pinnick also recently endorsed Schecter, and used two Model-T basses in 2011 for the Live Love over Europe tour.

He used Ampeg amplifiers exclusively, but the New York-based Tech 21 released his signature bass amp head, the dUg Ultra bass 1000. He also uses a complex rig set-up including many EQs and amplifiers. Additionally, Pinnick is a user of the Line 6 POD pro, which he employs for effects. Interestingly, he uses the guitar, not the bass model of the POD pro effects.

Discography

References

External links 

 
 
 2003 HM Magazine interview

1950 births
Living people
African-American rock musicians
African-American agnostics
20th-century African-American male singers
American heavy metal singers
American heavy metal bass guitarists
African-American rock singers
American former Protestants
African-American former Christians
LGBT African Americans
American LGBT singers
American LGBT songwriters
LGBT people from Illinois
People from Braidwood, Illinois
King's X members
American gay musicians
Progressive metal bass guitarists
American male bass guitarists
20th-century American bass guitarists
20th-century American male musicians
Magna Carta Records artists
African-American guitarists
20th-century LGBT people
21st-century LGBT people
21st-century African-American male singers
The Mob (American band) members
Gay singers
Gay songwriters